Luro may refer to:

Places
Lurö, an island in Säffle Municipality, Värmland County, Sweden
Luro Administrative Post, an administrative post in the Lautém Municipality of East Timor
Luro (suco), suco in Luro Subdistrict
Luro or Lygra, an island in Alver Municipality in Vestland County, Norway
Villa Luro, a barrio (district) of Buenos Aires, Argentina

People
Horatio Luro, a thoroughbred horse racing trainer in the United States
Pedro Luro, a French man who emigrated to Argentina to help colonize the Buenos Aires province